Belushi is a 2020 American documentary film about John Belushi, a comedian, actor, and singer. The film is directed, written, and produced by R. J. Cutler, based on interviews conducted for the book Belushi: A Biography by Tanner Colby.

Production
Belushi's widow Judy had been initially reluctant to cooperate, but eventually agreed. She provided the filmmakers with access to her late husband's archive.

Release
The film premiered on Showtime on November 22, 2020.

Reception
Belushi received positive reviews from critics. The website's consensus reads, "Affectionately chronicling John Belushi's outsized talent and personal foibles, this exhaustively-researched documentary captures both the joy and tragedy of the comedic titan's legacy." Owen Gleiberman of Variety called the film "meticulous and touching".

Cathy Smith omitted

Detroit-area film critic Tom Santilli wrote: "The documentary almost feels TOO close to Belushi...in that it seems to brush over some things that might seem obvious in other documentary films profiling a tragic life. For one example, the death of Belushi is not given much time at all, and sparse details are included, like how "friend" of Belushi and his supposed dealer, Cathy Smith, actually served 15 months in a California State Prison, after pleading guilty to manslaughter for being the one that injected Belushi with a lethal dose of cocaine and heroin (known as a "speedball"). There's also no mention of John's legacy or influence, which would have been a nice context to wrap into the film."

"Smith, 39, pleaded no contest June 11, 1986 to involuntary manslaughter and three counts of furnishing and administering controlled substances to Belushi, 33, in the hours before he was found dead on March 5, 1982, in a bungalow at the Chateau Marmont hotel in West Hollywood."

"John Belushi would not have died when he died except for the heroin that was furnished and administered by the defendant," the prosecutor said.

Smith was arrested at the scene, but was let go by police after questioning. She sold her story to the National Enquirer and fled to Canada where she was later deported after the story was published and the case was reopened. According to the transcript of Smith's police questioning, they didn't ask where she got the drugs, leading to speculation she was an informant and they gave them to her. She was let go because it was a sting gone bad.

References

External links

2020 films
2020 documentary films
American biographical films
American documentary films
Documentary films about actors
Documentary films about comedy and comedians
Films directed by R. J. Cutler
Showtime (TV network) documentary films
2020s English-language films
2020s American films